Reem bint Mohammed al-Mansoori is a Qatari civil servant and politician. In 2017 she was one of four women appointed to the Consultative Assembly, becoming one of the country's first female parliamentarians.

Biography
After studying for a BSc in computer science at Qatar University, al-Mansoori earned an MSc in computational intelligence at the University of Plymouth in the United Kingdom and an MBA at HEC Paris. Entering the civil service in Qatar, al-Mansoori became head of the Digital Society and Digital Industry Development departments within the Ministry of Transport and Communications.

Al-Mansoori was appointed to the Consultative Council in November 2017 by Emir Tamim bin Hamad Al Thani.

References

Living people
Qatar University alumni
Alumni of the University of Plymouth
HEC Paris alumni
Qatari civil servants
Qatari women in politics
Members of the Consultative Assembly of Qatar
Year of birth missing (living people)